The 1st Battalion, 1st Air Defense Artillery Regiment was organized in the 1790s as a company in the 2nd Regiment of Artillerists and Engineers. From there, the battalion was called upon to serve in multiple conflicts including the War of 1812, Indian Wars, Mexican–American War, World War II, and modern conflicts in the Middle East.

From February 2003 to May 2003, the battalion served in support of Operation Iraqi Freedom. Alpha and Bravo batteries deployed to provide air defense for the Kingdom of Bahrain, while the balance of the battalion deployed to Kuwait in support of operation there.

In February 2006, the battalion was deployed on a contingency operation to Kadena Air Base, Okinawa, Japan, to provide air defense for key assets in the Pacific region; the battalion arrived in November of that same year. The battalion is currently assigned to the 38th Air Defense Artillery Brigade, and is charged with providing air and missile defense in support of the INDOPACOM commander.

Campaign participation credit

War of 1812
Canada

Indian Wars
Seminoles
Texas 1859

Mexican War
Palo Alto
Resaca de la Palma
Monterey
Vera Cruz
Cerro Gordo
Contreras
Churubusco
Chapultepec
Tamaulipas 1846
Vera Cruz 1847
Mexico 1847

Civil War
Sumter
Bull Run
Mississippi River
Peninsula
Manassas
Antietam
Fredericksburg
Chancellorsville
Gettysburg
Wilderness
Spotsylvania
Cold Harbor
Petersburg
Shenandoah
Appomattox
Florida 1861
Florida 1862
Florida 1864
South Carolina 1862
South Carolina 1863
Virginia 1863
Virginia 1864
West Virginia 1863
 Louisiana 1864

World War II
American Theater, Streamer without inscription
Tunisia
Sicily
Rome-Arno
Rhineland

Southwest Asia
Defense of Saudi Arabia
Liberation and Defense of Kuwait
Cease-Fire
Operation Iraqi Freedom 2003

Decorations
1-1 ADA has received the following unit award(s):
 Meritorious Unit Award (2003)

See also
 2nd Air Defense Artillery Regiment (United States)

References

External links
 https://web.archive.org/web/20120614104018/http://www.tioh.hqda.pentagon.mil/Heraldry/ArmyDUISSICOA/ArmyHeraldryUnit.aspx?u=7150

Military units and formations established in 1821
001